The 2019 Big East men's soccer tournament, was the sixth men's soccer tournament of the current Big East Conference, formed in July 2013 after the original Big East Conference split into two leagues along football lines. Including the history of the original conference, it was the 25th edition of the Big East tournament.

Georgetown, the two-time defending champions, successfully three-peated, and won their third consecutive Big East Tournament title, defeating Providence 3–1 in the final. Georgetown would also go on to win their first NCAA Tournament championship in program history. In addition, three teams (Butler, Providence, and St. John's) earned at-large bids into the NCAA Tournament, giving the Big East the most tournament bids since 2014.

Future MLS player, Dylan Nealis won the Offensive MVP Award. Jack Beer won the Defensive MVP award.

Seeds

Bracket

Results

First round

Semifinals

Final

Statistics

Goals

Assists

All Tournament Team 
 Tournament Offensive MVP: Dylan Nealis, Georgetown
 Tournament Defensive MVP: Jack Beer, Geogetown

All-Tournament team:

 Brandon Guhl, Butler
 Rhys Myers, Butler
 Tani Oluwaseyi, St. John's
 Rafael Bustamante, St. John's
 Paulo Lima, Providence
 Esben Wolf, Providence

 Tiago Mendonca, Providence
 Sean Zawadzki, Georgetown
 Dante Polvara, Georgetown
 Dylan Nealis, Georgetown
 Jack Beer, Georgetown

References 

Big East Conference Men's Soccer Tournament
Big East Conference Men's Soccer Tournament
2019 in sports in Nebraska
2019 in sports in New York City
2019 in sports in Rhode Island
2019 in sports in Washington, D.C.